Coleophora duplicis is a moth of the family Coleophoridae. It is found in North America, including Ohio, British Columbia, Nova Scotia and Ontario.

The larvae feed on the seeds of Aster shortii and Solidago caesia. They create a trivalved, tubular silken case.

References

duplicis
Moths described in 1921
Moths of North America